This is a list of national secretaries of the Italian Communist Party. Until 1926 though the office of secretary did not exist. Amadeo Bordiga and Antonio Gramsci were members of the Executive Committee and Central Committee in the Communist Party of Italy (PCd'I).

Timeline

 
Communist Party Secretary